STS-122 was a NASA Space Shuttle mission to the International Space Station (ISS), flown by the . STS-122 marked the 24th shuttle mission to the ISS, and the 121st Space Shuttle flight overall.

The mission was also referred to as ISS-1E by the ISS program. The primary objective of STS-122 was to deliver the European Columbus science laboratory, built by the European Space Agency (ESA), to the station. It also returned Expedition 16 Flight Engineer Daniel M. Tani to Earth. Tani was replaced on Expedition 16 by Léopold Eyharts, a French Flight Engineer representing ESA. After Atlantis landing, the orbiter was prepared for STS-125, the final servicing mission for the Hubble Space Telescope.

The original target launch date for STS-122 was December 6, 2007, but due to engine cutoff sensor (ECO) reading errors, the launch was postponed to December 9, 2007. During the second launch attempt, the sensors failed again, and the launch was halted. A tanking test on December 18, 2007, revealed the probable cause to lie with a connector between the external tank and the shuttle. The connector was replaced and the shuttle launched during the third attempt on February 7, 2008.

Crew

Mission payloads

STS-122 was the ISS Assembly Flight 1E, which delivered the European Columbus laboratory module to the station, along with the Biolab, Fluid Science Laboratory (FSL), European Drawer Rack (EDR), and European Physiology Modules (EPM) payloads.

STS-122 also carried the Solar Monitoring Observatory (SOLAR), the European Technology Exposure Facility (EuTEF), and a new Nitrogen Tank Assembly, mounted in the cargo bay of an ICC-Lite payload rack, as well as a spare Drive Lock Assembly (DLA) sent to orbit in support of possible repairs to the starboard Solar Alpha Rotary Joint (SARJ), which was malfunctioning.

Several items were returned with Atlantis: A malfunctioning Control Moment Gyroscope (CMG) that was swapped out with a new one during STS-118, and the empty Nitrogen Tank Assembly was placed in the orbiter's payload bay, along with a trundle bearing from the Starboard SARJ that was removed during an EVA performed by Expedition 16.

Outreach
Stowed within the Official Flight Kit (OFK), Atlantis carried three green starting flags provided by NASCAR in recognition of the 50th running of the Daytona 500 on February 17, 2008, and the 50th anniversary of NASA on October 1, 2008. Once returned to Earth, one of the flown flags will be placed on public display at the Daytona International Speedway in Florida, one will be presented to Ryan Newman, the winner of the 2008 Daytona 500, and the third will be used by NASA as part of its anniversary activities.

Mission background
The mission marks:
152nd NASA crewed spaceflight.
121st Space Shuttle flight since STS-1.
29th flight of Atlantis
96th post-Challenger mission.
8th post-Columbia mission.
8th visit to the International Space Station for Atlantis.
300th US astronaut in space.

Shuttle processing

Launch preparations
The external tank (ET-125) arrived at the Kennedy Space Center on September 14, 2007, after traveling by barge from the Michoud Assembly Facility in Louisiana. The external tank was then transferred to the Vehicle Assembly Building (VAB) to be inspected, and have the Liquid oxygen feedline bracket modified, before being mated to the solid rocket boosters on October 17, 2007.

The external tank was attached to the solid rocket boosters on October 18, 2007, and Atlantis moved to the VAB on November 3, 2007. With the entire stack placed upon the mobile launcher platform, Atlantis moved to launch pad 39A on November 10, 2007, and the Columbus module was loaded into the orbiter's payload bay on November 12. The terminal countdown demonstration test was completed on November 20, 2007.

Following the final Flight Readiness Review on November 30, 2007, NASA managers announced that Atlantis was ready to fly, and the launch date of December 6, 2007, was confirmed. The crew arrived at Kennedy Space Center on December 3, 2007, to prepare for the first launch attempt on December 6, 2007.

December 6 (launch attempt 1)
On Thursday, December 6, 2007, 16 minutes into the loading of the liquid hydrogen and liquid oxygen into the external tank, two of the four liquid hydrogen engine cutoff (ECO) sensors failed to respond correctly, resulting in Launch Director Doug Lyons deciding to postpone the launch. The fuel cutoff sensor system is one of a series of redundant systems that protect the shuttle's main engines, by triggering engine shutdown if fuel runs unexpectedly low. The Launch Commit Criteria (LCC) require that three of the four sensor systems function properly prior to liftoff. The scheduled launch time was tentatively postponed 48 hours to December 8, 2007, at 15:43 EST (20:43 UTC).

On December 7, 2007, managers evaluated the options to fly, under the flight rationale guidelines. The issue was thought to be in the wiring inside the external tank, that results in the ECO sensors reporting incorrectly. During loading, testing of the ECO sensors is done to ensure they function properly, but when the "dry tank" command was sent, the third and fourth sensors continued to report "wet" conditions. The concern was that if the tank were about to run dry, the sensors that control the shutdown of the shuttle's main engines might not send the shutdown command, resulting in running the engines without fuel, a dangerous situation. Managers evaluated if the Launch Commit Criteria could be removed, allowing Atlantis to fly with two of four sensors, and augment the LCO system with on-ground monitoring of propellant use by the Flight Control staff. The other option would involve repair or replacement of the sensors, which would most likely require the orbiter be moved back into the Vehicle Assembly Building, and would rule out a December launch.

Following the Mission Management Team meeting on December 7, 2007, Shuttle Program Director Wayne Hale explained during the press briefing that the team had discussed the issues at length, and had tentatively decided to attempt a Sunday launch. The Launch Commit Criteria would be changed, and Flight Controller procedures would be finalized to allow for additional monitoring of the ECO system during ascent. One of the changes to the LCC will be the requirement that during tanking, all four sensors must be operational. In the past, when this system has failed during the initial launch attempt, all four sensors performed normally during the next attempt. If this were the case for Sunday's launch attempt, it would be consistent with what has been seen in the past. If the sensors fail during re-tanking on December 9, 2007, this would indicate that the issue is not consistent with the evidence seen in the past. Managers would hold an MMT meeting on December 8, 2007, to further discuss this rationale, and the Flight Controller procedures, before making a final decision.

On December 8, 2007, the Mission Management Team met to finalize plans for the Sunday launch, and discuss possible launch options. There was a unanimous decision to attempt a Sunday launch using the modified Launch Commit Criteria. The modified criteria require all four ECO sensors to function normally during tanking, include the implementation of a Flight Controller procedure to continue monitoring the ECO sensors after liftoff during ascent, and shorten the launch window from five minutes to one minute to conserve fuel. Those changes would be done only for the launch of STS-122, and are not permanent changes. Should any of the sensors give errors during tanking, the launch attempt would be scrubbed. Following STS-122, Space Shuttle Program Director Wayne Hale and Mission Management Team Chairman LeRoy Cain explained that there would be a variety of activities and procedures put into effect to address the ECO issues. A multi-center troubleshooting team would be convened, and changes to the main engines would be performed, to improve the way the engines use and control the liquid hydrogen reserves, including upgrades to the flow meters inside the engines.

December 9 (Launch attempt 2)

Fueling of Atlantis began at 05:55 EST (10:55 UTC). During fueling at 06:52 EST, the third ECO sensor failed wet, violating the modified Launch Commit Criteria that required all four sensors to function properly. The launch was officially scrubbed at 07:25 EST (12:25 UTC). Troubleshooting the problem would rule out a December launch. NASA finally gave a new launch date of January 10, 2008.

During the post-scrub news conference, Launch Director Doug Lyons said that a rollback to the Vehicle Assembly Building was not a situation managers were considering currently, and explained that the pad offers extensive access to the systems for troubleshooting and investigation. "We can do extensive troubleshooting out there before we would entertain rolling back. There's not many things we can't do out at the launch pad that we could do in the VAB." Managers have convened a short-term troubleshooting team to design a plan to identify, and hopefully predict, or prevent the ECO anomaly.

ECO sensor troubleshooting and recovery
After the second failed launch attempt, NASA initiated a search for the root cause of the ECO sensor problem. In order to gather more data they scheduled a tanking test for December 18, 2007. Engineers installed test wiring that was leading from the tail mast of the orbiter into the interior of the Mobile Launcher Platform (MLP), where Time-domain reflectometry (TDR) test equipment was installed to test the ECO sensor system. Engineer Peter Johnson and Dr. Carlos T. Mata operated two TDRs to gather data about the characteristics of the behaviour of the sensor circuitry before, during, and after tanking. NASA was able to pinpoint the problem to the LH2 external tank feed-through connector.

Radiator Retract Hose
During launch preparations at Kennedy, technicians noticed a small section of the aft radiator retract hose that was bent in a shape similar to the Greek letter Omega. The hose is part of the shuttle's cooling system that carries Freon, and is designed to flex when the payload bay doors are opened and closed. Making sure they were not overlooking potential problems, NASA engineers designed a tool to guide the hose back into the storage box, and performed the procedure on February 3, 2008. Engineers would monitor the hose during STS-122, and in the unlikely event that it were to begin leaking Freon, the shuttle's computers would turn off the redundant radiator system before any Freon had a chance to leak out.

Mission timeline

February 7 (Flight day 1, Launch)

Fueling began at 05:26 EST, ahead of a planned 14:45 EST launch. The fuel sensors all performed as expected, and at 14:35 EST, Launch Director Doug Lyons gave Atlantis crewmembers the go to launch, with no constraints. Atlantis launched on schedule, at 14:45 EST (19:45 UTC). Main engine cutoff (MECO) occurred at 19:54 UTC. After MECO and ET separation, the orbiter executed an OMS-2 engine firing to circularize the orbit, and put it on track to the International Space Station. The crew opened the payload bay doors, deployed the Ku antenna, checked out and activated the shuttle's robotic arm, and downlinked the video footage taken during external tank separation to NASA managers.

February 8 (Flight day 2)
The crew of Atlantis spent the day performing a variety of tasks designed to prepare the shuttle for docking on Saturday, including the installation of the centerline camera, and the extension of the orbiter docking system ring. A majority of the day's activities was devoted to inspecting the shuttle's thermal protection system using the Orbiter Boom Sensor System (OBSS). Early in the morning, the crew performed a burn of the Orbital Maneuvering System (OMS) engines to adjust the orbit in preparation for docking with the International Space Station. During interviews with CBS and NBC in the morning, Expedition 16 Commander Peggy Whitson told reporters that since her birthday was Saturday, "My present is a new module that we're going to install on the station, I'm really looking forward to it."

During the afternoon mission status briefing at Johnson Space Center, Lead Shuttle Flight Director Mike Sarafin said that there were no technical issues, and the mission was on schedule for docking on Saturday at 17:25 UTC. He reported that the orbiter had sufficient consumables for a mission extension, but the decision on whether to extend the mission would be made no earlier than flight day five, to allow the team to evaluate the inspection data. If the mission were extended, Sarafin said the extra day would be inserted into day nine, following the third EVA. Chairman of the Mission Management Team (MMT) John Shannon reported that his team gave the official "go" for docking during their first on-orbit meeting. Shannon noted that the initial imagery given to the engineering team showed "absolutely nothing of concern", with only one foam piece appearing to possibly impact the vehicle, 440 seconds into ascent. Shannon said any item that late into ascent would not have enough energy to do any significant damage if it did strike the orbiter, and the managers did not consider it an issue. Shannon said the team would evaluate the data obtained during Saturday's Rendezvous Pitch Maneuver, performed prior to docking, as well as the imagery from the OBSS survey, and during flight day 3's MMT meeting a decision would be made whether a focused inspection of the orbiter's thermal protection system would be needed. Shannon noted that the improvements to the external tank have proven to be "phenomenal", and was pleased with the initial data.

February 9 (Flight day 3)

The shuttle crew worked through the rendezvous timeline in the morning, including several adjustment burns of the orbiter's engines to refine the path towards the station. Between 16:24 and 16:31 UTC, Atlantis performed the Rendezvous Pitch Maneuver to allow the station crew to use high resolution cameras and document the thermal protection system. Extra images were taken of the starboard OMS pod as it was an "area of interest" due to the appearance of a raised blanket. Atlantis docked with station at 17:17 UTC (12:17 pm EST). Atlantis is the first orbiter to dock to the new position of the Pressurized Mating Adapter at the forward end of the Harmony module.

After working through a variety of leak check procedures, the hatches were opened between the shuttle and station at 18:40 UTC, and the two crews exchanged greetings and conducted a mandatory safety briefing. After the briefing, they began the rest of the day's tasks, including moving the station's robotic arm to grapple the OBSS, and then hand it off to the shuttle's robotic arm in preparation for future activities. The official exchange of Expedition 16 crewmembers Daniel Tani and Eyharts was completed in the evening, when they exchanged their Soyuz custom made seat liners, and Tani became a member of the STS-122 crew, while Eyharts began his position as flight engineer for Expedition 16.

During the mission status briefing, Flight Director Mike Sarafin stated that one of the three General Purpose Computers (GPC) failed to start up correctly before the rendezvous, but it did not impact the rendezvous. Sarafin also confirmed that they were investigating a slight tear in the thermal protection blanket on the starboard (right side) OMS pod.

At 20:14 UTC, the ground team radioed the crew to alert them that the managers had decided to make a 24-hour delay to EVA-1, originally scheduled for Flight Day 4, and that Stanley Love would replace Hans Schlegel for EVA-1 on Monday. During the post-MMT briefing, Mission Management Chairman John Shannon explained there was a "crew medical issue", but it would not impact the mission objectives. For reasons of medical privacy, Shannon said NASA can not disclose which crewmember is affected, and no details would be given as to the nature of the issue, but Shannon said it was not something to be concerned about. Unconfirmed news reports claim that Schlegel had "lost his voice", and since communication is a critical function of an EVA, the decision to swap crewmembers was made. Shannon also noted that Atlantis has enough consumables to extend almost two days; the mission operations team was looking at procedures to assist with power conservation, and the team hopes to add another day extension to the mission.

February 10 (Flight day 4)
The two crews spent their first joint mission day working through a focused inspection of the OMS pod blanket, reviewing the upcoming EVA procedures, and beginning the transfer of items from the shuttle to the station. Earlier in the day, ESA confirmed the crewmember with the medical condition was Schlegel, but stated it was nothing serious and does not impact the health of any of the other crewmembers. Tani and Eyharts spent several hours working through a variety of station familiarization procedures, designed to assist Eyharts in learning where items are on the station. Love, Walheim and Schlegel were given several hours in their daily timeline to go over the EVA. Walheim and Love will spend the night in the Quest airlock in preparation for Monday's EVA.

During the mission status briefing, MMT Chairman John Shannon stated that the rest of the mission will follow the plan, with no changes expected. Commenting on the ongoing thermal protection system review, Shannon said "The thermal protection system inspections that we do are going extremely well, it's the fastest I've ever seen them done on a flight. We have completely cleared the bottom of the orbiter, there are no issues we are working on the bottom, and all of the reinforced carbon-carbon on the wings and the nose are completely cleared. We're gathering additional information on the right OMS pod. Atlantis is extremely clean." The blanket would be evaluated more on Monday, and a decision regarding that area is expected to be made at the MMT meeting Monday evening. There were a few areas of interest around the windows that were also being evaluated.

February 11 (Flight day 5)

After awakening, both crews began preparing for the mission's first spacewalk. Love and Walheim suited up, and the EVA began slightly ahead of schedule, at 14:13 UTC (09:13 EST). Assisting the spacewalkers inside the station and shuttle were pilot Alan Poindexter, and Mission Specialist Hans Schlegel.

At 19:53 UTC (14:53 EST), Walheim and Love completed the preparations for the unberthing of Columbus from the payload bay, and with Melvin inside the space station working the robotic arm, the module was successfully lifted out of the payload bay. The first contact of Columbus with the station was at 21:29, and at 21:44, Eyharts and Melvin announced that Columbus was officially installed on its new home in orbit. "Houston and Munich, the European Columbus laboratory module is now part of the ISS," Eyharts radioed to the ground. Walheim and Love began the re-pressurization of the Quest airlock at 22:11 UTC (17:11 EST), which marked the official end of their 7-hour, 58 minute EVA.

February 12 (Flight day 6)

The two crews spent the day working to activate and outfit the newest addition to the station, the Columbus module. After the ground conducted a variety of leak checks during the crew's sleep period the night before, the crew was given the go ahead to put the module into what is called "Berth Survival Mode", which is a "functional mode": A minimal healthy configuration that can be maintained for extended time periods, if required. This involved powering up basic computers, power distribution units, and heaters. The crew completed the Berth Survival Mode activation quickly, and moved on to final activation. Representing the European partners, Schlegel and Eyharts were the first crewmembers to enter the module, performing a partial ingress at 14:08 UTC (09:08 EST). Eyharts told the team on the ground, "We have a special thought at this moment for all the people in Europe and the U.S. who have contributed to the make up of Columbus. Especially to the space agencies, of course, the industry, but also all the citizens who are supporting space flight. This is a great moment, and Hans and I are very proud to be here and to ingress for the first time the Columbus module."

By the afternoon, after allowing the circulation fans to work for several hours to clean out any residual particulates in the air, crewmembers were going in and out, working on hooking up water, thermal controls, and command and monitoring units. During the afternoon's mission status briefing, ISS Orbit One Flight Director Bob Dempsey noted that the two crews were far ahead of the timeline for activation, and excited about the station's new addition.

In the early evening, the ground team radioed the crew to let Commander Frick know that the Mission Management Team had officially cleared the right OMS pod blanket for return "as-is", and there were no safety concerns. The crew of Atlantis also took some time out to talk to reporters on the ground, one session in the morning, and another in the afternoon with CBS News, and Pittsburgh television stations. Frick, a native of Pittsburgh, Schlegel, and Poindexter participated in the afternoon interviews. Asked how he was feeling, Schlegel said he was proud to be a part of the mission to deliver Columbus, that the "big mission" was what mattered, and he was feeling fine and ready to perform the mission's second EVA. Walheim and Schlegel spent the night in the station's airlock in preparation for Wednesday's EVA.

February 13 (Flight day 7)

After awakening, the station and shuttle crews began working on preparing for the second EVA. Station Commander Whitson and shuttle Commander Frick assisted Walheim and Schlegel in suiting up and working through the pre-EVA procedures. Eyharts and the rest of the crew aboard the station continued their work on outfitting and activating the new Columbus module, as well as working on transferring items between the shuttle and the station. The second EVA began officially at 14:27 UTC (09:27 EST) and ended at 21:12 UTC (16:12 EST). Walheim and Schlegel replaced a near empty Nitrogen Tank Assembly of the P1 truss with a new full tank that was brought in orbit by STS-122.

During the mission status briefing, Lead ISS Flight Director Sally Davis announced that the managers had officially approved an additional docked day extension, and the team had also cleared the orbiter's entire thermal protection system for re-entry, pending late inspection results. The right OMS pod blanket was determined to be of no issue for re-entry the day before, and the areas around the orbiter's windows that appeared damaged were fully cleared. A tile that fell off during launch from the left Reaction Control System engine, called a "LOMS stinger tile" was deemed to be from a non-critical area, and was also cleared.

February 14 (Flight day 8)
The two crews had a light day scheduled, designed to give the crew some rest after a busy week of activities. Several media interviews were conducted, including interviews with NBC News and a number of radio stations, as well as a special ESA event, a VIP call with German Chancellor Angela Merkel who called to congratulate Eyharts and Schlegel, as representatives of the European Space Agency on the successful delivery and installation of the Columbus module to the station. The joint crews also did some maintenance tasks, including a waste water dump from the shuttle, transfer activities, and continued work on outfitting and activating the Columbus module. Both crews participated in an EVA review in the late afternoon, and Walheim and Love spent the night in the station's airlock in preparation for the mission's final spacewalk.

February 15 (Flight day 9)
After awakening at 08:45 UTC, Walheim and Love spent the morning preparing for the mission's final spacewalk, assisted by Whitson and Frick, while the rest of the crew worked on Columbus outfitting, transfers, and preparation for robotics support during the EVA. The third EVA officially began at 13:07 UTC (08:07 EST) and ended at 20:32 UTC (15:32 EST).

February 16 (Flight day 10)
While the ongoing task of outfitting the Columbus module continued, Atlantis propulsion system was fired for 36 minutes to reboost the station's altitude by 1.4 miles (2.2 kilometers) in preparation for the arrival of Space Shuttle Endeavour during STS-123. Also, all members of the shuttle and station crews participated in news conferences with American and European media.

February 17 (Flight day 11)
Hatches between Atlantis and the ISS were closed at 18:03 GMT.

February 18 (Flight day 12)
Atlantis undocked from the ISS at 9:24 UTC (4:24 am EST).

February 19 (Flight day 13)

The crew performed final inspections and preparations prior to landing.

February 20 (Flight day 14, Landing)
The crew were cleared to close Atlantis''' payload bay doors at 10:14 UTC, and this was completed by 10:28 UTC. At 12:32 UTC, NASA cleared Atlantis to land on its first opportunity at KSC. A two-minute-43-second de-orbit burn was conducted, beginning at 13:00 UTC. This was followed by entry interface at 13:35 UTC. Atlantis'' touched down on Runway 15 of the Shuttle Landing Facility at 9:07 am EST (14:07:10 UTC), approximately 12 days, 18 hours, 21 minutes and 40 seconds into the mission. Wheel stop occurred at 09:08 EST (14:08:08 UTC).

Extra-vehicular activity

Three spacewalks were scheduled and completed during STS-122. The cumulative time in extra-vehicular activity during the mission was 22 hours, 8 minutes.

Wake-up calls 
NASA began a tradition of playing music to astronauts during the Gemini program, which was first used to wake up a flight crew during Apollo 15.
Each track is specially chosen, often by their families, and usually has a special meaning to an individual member of the crew, or is applicable to their daily activities.

Media

See also
 2008 in spaceflight
 List of human spaceflights
 List of International Space Station spacewalks
 List of Space Shuttle missions
 Lists of spacewalks and moonwalks
 Space Shuttle program

References

External links

 NASA's main Space Shuttle page
 NASA: Meet the STS-122 Launch Team
 NASA: STS-122 mission summary
 STS-122 mission animations
 
 CBS News Space Place – Full coverage of STS-122
 ESA: STS-122 lift off info
 Up to the minute STS-122 Shuttle Report
 STS-122 Official Flight Kit Manifest

Space Shuttle missions
Spacecraft launched in 2008
Spacecraft which reentered in 2008
Articles containing video clips